Charlotte Bredahl (born 21 April 1957) is an American equestrian. She was born in Copenhagen, Denmark. She won a bronze medal in team  dressage at the 1992 Summer Olympics in Barcelona, together with Robert Dover, Carol Lavell and Michael Poulin.

References

1957 births
Living people
Sportspeople from Copenhagen
American female equestrians
Olympic bronze medalists for the United States in equestrian
Equestrians at the 1992 Summer Olympics
Danish emigrants to the United States
American dressage riders
Medalists at the 1992 Summer Olympics
21st-century American women
20th-century American women